The Conference USA Men's Basketball Player of the Year is a basketball award given to Conference USA's (C-USA) most outstanding player. The award was first given following C-USA's inaugural 1995–96 season. Two players have received the award multiple times: Danny Fortson (1996, 1997) and Steve Logan (2001, 2002). Coincidentally, both players attended the University of Cincinnati. Another Bearcat, Kenyon Martin, won the C-USA Player of the Year award the same season he was selected as the consensus national player of the year (2000).

Cincinnati and Memphis have the most awards, with five each; Memphis has the most individual winners, with all of its awards having been won by different players. However, neither school is currently a member of the conference. Due to C-USA having lost many members in both the 2005 and early-2010s conference realignment cycles, only seven of its current 14 members have had a winner. The four current C-USA members with more than one winner are Charlotte, Louisiana Tech, Middle Tennessee, and UAB; Charlotte and UAB will both leave C-USA in 2023.

Key

Winners

Winners by school

References

.

NCAA Division I men's basketball conference players of the year
Player Of The Year
Awards established in 1996